Hacalıkənd (also, Gadzhali, Gadzhalikend, and Gadzhalykend) is a village and municipality in the Goychay Rayon of Azerbaijan.  It has a population of 1,063.

References 

Populated places in Goychay District